Gobiosuchus ("Gobi [desert] crocodile") was a gobiosuchid crocodyliform described in 1972 by Polish palaeontologist Halszka Osmólska. It hails from the Late Cretaceous (Early Campanian) of Bayn Dzak (Djadokhta Formation), in the Gobi Desert of Mongolia.

The type species is Gobiosuchus kielanae. Gobiosuchus kielanae, along with Zaraasuchus shepardi, belongs to the family Gobiosuchidae.

References
 Pol, D. & Norell, M. A., (2004). "A new gobiosuchid crocodyliform taxon from the Cretaceous of Mongolia". American Museum Novitates 3458: 1-31.

Late Cretaceous crocodylomorphs of Asia
Terrestrial crocodylomorphs
Djadochta fauna
Fossils of Mongolia
Gobi Desert
Prehistoric pseudosuchian genera